J.D.s is a queer punk zine founded and co-published in Toronto, Ontario, Canada by G. B. Jones and Bruce LaBruce, that ran for eight issues from 1985 to 1991.

" J.D.s is seen by many to be the catalyst that pushed the queercore scene into existence", writes Amy Spencer in DIY: The Rise of Lo-Fi Culture. Writing in the journal C: International Contemporary Art, Earl Miller calls J.D.s "tremendously influential."

After the initial release of the first few issues of J.D.s, the editors wrote a manifesto called "Don't Be Gay" which was featured in Maximum RocknRoll zine. According to Amy Spencer, "The article appeared in February 1989 and simultaneously attacked both punk and gay subcultures..." G. B. Jones states, "Our goal, vis-à-vis the punk scene, was to antagonize." Spencer continues, "Following their article, a queer punk culture did begin to emerge."

The editors had initially chosen the appellation "homocore" to describe the movement they began, but later replaced the word 'homo' with 'queer' to create Queercore, to better reflect the diversity of the scene and to  disassociate themselves completely from the oppressive confines of the gay and lesbian communities' orthodoxy and agenda.  G.B. Jones says, "We were just as eager to provoke the gays and lesbians as we were the punks." According to Bruce LaBruce, J.D.s initially stood for juvenile delinquents, but "also encompassed such youth cult icons as James Dean and J. D. Salinger."

The zine featured the photos and the Tom Girl drawings of G.B. Jones, stories by Bruce LaBruce, and the "J.D.s Top Ten Homocore Hits", a list of queer-themed songs such as "Off-Duty Sailor" by The Dicks, "Only Loved At Night" by The Raincoats, "Gimme Gimme Gimme (A Man After Midnight)" by The Leather Nun, "Homophobia" by Victim's Family, "I, Bloodbrother Be" by Shock Headed Peters, "The Anal Staircase" by Coil and many more. Groups like Anti-Scrunti Faction were featured in the fanzine. Contributors included  Donny the Punk, comic artist Anonymous Boy, author Dennis Cooper, artist Carrie McNinch, musician Anita Smith, punk drag performer Vaginal Davis and Klaus and Jena von Brücker.

Zines such as Homocore and Fanorama, among others,  credit J.D.s with inspiring them to begin publishing.

In 1990, J.D.s released the first compilation of queercore songs, a cassette tape entitled J.D.s Top Ten Homocore Hit Parade Tape, which featured the groups The Apostles, Academy 23 and No Brain Cells from the UK, Fifth Column, Zuzu's Petals and Toilet Slaves from Canada, Bomb, Big Man, Robt. Omlit and Nikki Parasite of The Parasites from the U.S. and, from New Zealand, Gorse.

In 1990 and 1991, G.B. Jones and Bruce LaBruce began presenting J.D.s movie nights. These happened in London in the UK, in San Francisco, and at Hallwalls in Buffalo in the U.S., and in  Montreal, and Toronto in Canada with the editors and various contributors showing films, all made on extremely low budgets on Super 8 film, such as Jones' The Troublemakers and LaBruce's Boy, Girl and Bruce and Pepper Wayne Gacy's Home Movies.

See also
Queer theory

References

External links 
 Archived copies of J.D.s fanzine in PDF format at the Queer Zine Archive Project

LGBT-related magazines published in Canada
Music magazines published in Canada
Defunct magazines published in Canada
LGBT culture in Toronto
Magazines established in 1985
Magazines disestablished in 1991
Magazines published in Toronto
Punk zines
Queercore
1980s LGBT literature
1990s LGBT literature
1985 establishments in Ontario